Mousumi Nag is a Bangladeshi model and actress. She made her media debut in the television drama Shure Akaa Chobi  in 2006, which was a commercial success.  Since then, she has acted 150 dramas and is now one of the most popular names in the Bangladeshi TV drama industry. She has also appeared in films.

Career 
Moushumi became most famous after playing a role in the film Run Out. In this movie, she co-starred with another famous TV celebrity, Shajal Noor. The film was a success at the box office. She then she acted in several Dhallywood films, including Feel My Love and many others.

Personal life 
Mousumi Nag married Mithu Biswas in 2000 and changed her name to Mousumi Biswas. This couple has a son named Prithibi Biswas. Mousumi divorced Mithu and married Soeb Islam on 29 August 2013. This couple also has a son, born on 14 September 2015.

Filmography 
  Run Out
  Prarthona
  Fill My Love
  Full HD

See also
 Cinema of Bangladesh

References

External links
 
 Mousumi Nag (BMDB)

Living people
People from Dhaka
Bangladeshi film actresses
Bangladeshi television actresses
21st-century Bangladeshi actresses
Year of birth missing (living people)
Bengali Hindus
Bangladeshi Hindus
Bangladeshi female models
Bangladeshi stage actresses